Niiles Hiirola, professionally known as Nikke Ankara, is a Finnish rapper. His first single "Perjantai 13.", produced by Henri "MGI" Lanz, was released in May 2014 through Universal Music Finland. He also appears as a featured guest on fellow rapper Brädi's 2014 album III and on Robin's 2014 single "Parasta just nyt".

On 17 January 2015, Hiirola announced that he will be ending his musical career. However, in May 2015 it was reported that he was back in the studio working on new material. His debut album Nikke tulee kotiin was released on 20 November 2015; his second, Ootsä nähny Nikkee, was released in 2018. Hiirola participated in the sixth season of the Finnish music reality show Vain elämää.

Discography

Albums

Singles

Other charted songs

Featured on

References

Living people
Finnish rappers
People from Lahti
Year of birth missing (living people)